Mohammad Sirajul Haque is a Bangladesh politician of Kurigram district and former member of Parliament for Undivided Rangpur-17 (Bangladesh 28) (now Kurigram-4) constituency in 1979.

Early life and education

Mohammad Sirajul Haq was born in the village of Mother Tila, under the Rowmari subdistrict, district Kurigram. His father name was Mohammad Osman Goni, a religious person and was keen to help people and to develop the community. Mohammad Goni used to let his son, Sirajul Haq, to deliver speech in public place in order to improve his son's skill to talk in front of public. From childhood, Sirajul Haq had been grown as a motivational public speaker. He had been graduated (economics) from the University of Rajshahi, then he passed bachelor of law. He dedicated his whole life for the betterment of the society.

Career 
Haque was a professor at Kurigram College and principal of Roumari Degree College. Time to time he practised as a lawer at the Kugrigram Distric Court. He was elected a member of parliament from Undivided Rangpur- 17 as an Independent candidate in 1979 Bangladeshi general election. When Bangladesh Jamaat-e-Islami was established in 1979, he joined Jamaat politics.

He was defeated in the third parliamentary elections of 1986, the fifth parliamentary elections of 1991 and the seventh parliamentary elections of 12 June 1996 as a candidate of Bangladesh Jamaat-e-Islami from Kurigram-4 constituency.

References 

Living people
Year of birth missing (living people)
People from Kurigram District
Bangladesh Jamaat-e-Islami politicians
Islamic Democratic League politicians
2nd Jatiya Sangsad members